Kohana may refer to:

 Kohana (orca), a captive orca
 Kohana, a Kamen Rider Den-O character
 Kohana cat, a minor cat breed